Uttar Mechogram (also called Uttar Mechgram) is a village, in Panskura CD block in Tamluk subdivision of Purba Medinipur district in the state of West Bengal, India.

Geography

Location
Uttar Mechogram is located at

Urbanisation
94.08% of the population of Tamluk subdivision live in the rural areas. Only 5.92% of the population live in the urban areas, and that is the second lowest proportion of urban population amongst the four subdivisions in Purba Medinipur district, just above Egra subdivision.

Note: The map alongside presents some of the notable locations in the subdivision. All places marked in the map are linked in the larger full screen map.

Demographics
As per 2011 Census of India Uttar Mechgram had a total population of 3,072 of which 1,571 (51%) were males and 1,501 (49%) were females. Population below 6 years was 283. The total number of literates in Uttar Mechgram was 2,309 (82.79% of the population over 6 years).

Transport
National Highway 116B passes through Panskura, located nearby.

Healthcare
Uttar Mechogram Rural Hospital at Uttar Mechogram, PO Keshapat (with 30 beds) is the main medical facility in Panskura CD block. There are primary health centres at Purba Itarah, PO Raghunathbari (with 6 beds) and Patanda (with 10 beds).

References

Villages in Purba Medinipur district